Primary State Highways in the U.S. state of Virginia, are numbered and maintained by the Virginia Department of Transportation as a system of state highways. Primary State Routes receive more funding than Secondary State Routes and are numbered as U.S. Routes or State Routes with numbers from 1 to 599. State Route 785 and State Route 895 are also primary routes, numbered as Interstate Highway spurs. Former numbers are reused often; only 29 of the numbers from 1 to 421 are not in use, with only seven of these under 260.


List of primary routes

Special routes

See also 
 State highways serving Virginia state institutions
 List of primary state highways in Virginia shorter than one mile

References 

  , revised July 1, 2003
 Virginia Highways Project
 1930s county maps
 
</ref>

Primary